James Ian Craig Boyd (31 March 1921 – 20 February 2009) was an English author and narrow-gauge railway historian.

Boyd spent a lifetime researching and writing on narrow-gauge railways. His books on narrow-gauge railways in North and Mid Wales, the Isle of Man and Ireland are considered to be standard works on the subject. His books, published by The Oakwood Press since 1949, are rarely out of print, reflecting their importance to, and popularity with, railway historians and enthusiasts.

Biography
Boyd was born on 31 July 1921 into a family long connected with the Scottish textile machinery industry. His lifelong work was considerably helped by an inheritance from his family, without which much of his work could not have been done.

In his formative years he had W. H. Auden as an English teacher and was taught mathematics and science by Geoffrey Hoyland, a qualified railway engineer, at The Downs School in Colwall. After school he took over the family textile business, then based in Manchester.

Boyd was an early volunteer on the Talyllyn Railway - the first volunteer-run heritage railway in the world. He organized the first regional working group of volunteers on the Talyllyn. In 1949, he published his first Narrow-Gauge Rails to Portmadoc which described the history of the recently closed Ffestiniog Railway. This was popular and inspired the successful efforts to preserve and re-open the railway. Much of his writing was focused on the  gauge railways of Ireland. Although his work is considered the standard for the railways covered, he did not always make it clear when his writing was factual and when it was his opinion of the facts.

Retiring from the textiles industry in the late 1960s, Boyd moved to Colwall and became a manager at the Downs School. At the same time, he was appointed to look after the  gauge Downs Light Railway and started a twenty-year restoration that would ultimately result in his efforts being recognised with a miniature steam locomotive bearing his name. Boyd later retired from the school, but continued to fight to preserve the railway amidst Headmasters who failed to see the historical and educational importance, and led the formation of the Downs Light Railway Trust in 1983. Boyd continued to oversee the railway up to the millennium, despite suffering a stroke in the 1990s.

Works

References

External links

1921 births
2009 deaths
20th-century English historians
English non-fiction writers
Historians of technology
English male non-fiction writers
People educated at The Downs School, Herefordshire
Rail transport writers
Railway historians
20th-century English male writers